The PPD (Pistolet-Pulemyot Degtyaryova, Russian: Пистоле́т-пулемёт Дегтярёва, Degtyaryov's machine pistol) is a submachine gun originally designed in 1934 by Vasily Degtyaryov. The PPD had a conventional wooden stock, fired from an open bolt, and was capable of selective fire. It was replaced by the PPSh-41.

History

Developed in the Soviet Union by arms designer Vasily Degtyaryov. The PPD was designed to chamber the new Soviet 7.62×25mm Tokarev pistol cartridge, which was based on the 7.63×25mm Mauser cartridge used in the Mauser C96 pistol. The later PPD models utilized a large drum magazine for the ammunition drum.

The PPD officially went into military service with the Red Army in 1935 as the PPD-34, although it was not produced in large quantities. Production issues were not solved until 1937; in 1934 only 44 were produced, in 1935 only 23; production picked up in 1937 with 1,291 produced, followed by 1,115 produced in 1938 and 1,700 produced in 1939. It saw use with the NKVD internal forces as well as border guards. The PPD was decommissioned entirely in 1939 and factory orders cancelled following a directive of the People's Commissariat of Defence Industry; the decision was quickly reversed, though, after the personal intervention of Degtyaryov with Stalin, with whom he had a good personal relationship. During the Winter War in 1939 with Finland, an acute lack of individual automatic weapons even led to the reintroduction of the stockpiled Fedorov Avtomats into service.

In 1938 and 1940, modifications were designated PPD-34/38 and PPD-40 respectively, and introduced minor changes, mostly aimed at making it easier to manufacture. Mass production began in 1940, a year in which 81,118 PPDs were produced. Nevertheless, the PPD-40 was too labor- and resource-expensive to mass-produce economically, most of its metal components being produced by milling. Although it was used in action in  World War II, it was officially replaced by the superior and cheaper PPSh-41 by the end of 1941. Shpagin's great innovation in Soviet automatic weapons manufacturing was the large-scale introduction of stamped metal parts, particularly receivers; the PPSh also had a muzzle climb compensator which significantly improved accuracy over the PPD. In 1941 only 5,868 PPDs were made, compared to 98,644 PPSh and in the following year almost 1.5 million PPSh were produced.

PPDs captured by Finnish forces during the Winter War and Continuation War were issued to coastal and home guard troops and kept in reserve until approximately 1960. PPD-34/38 and PPD-40 submachine guns captured by the Wehrmacht were given the designations MP.715(r) and MP.716(r) respectively.

A number of PPD-like submachine guns were also manufactured in a semi-artisanal way by gunsmiths among the hundreds of thousands of Soviet partisans. These guns, even when made as late as 1944, used milling because metal stamping requires large industrial facilities that were not available to the partisans. There are no firm numbers about how many were made, but there were at least six partisan gunsmiths each making his own model series. One of them is known to have produced 28 such sub-machine guns in approximately two years.

Users

: Received 3,000 during the Second Sino Japanese War.

 Lebanese Forces

 Hukbalahap

: Use of PPD-34/38 by the Spanish Republican Army during Spanish Civil War.
: 5,000 were delivered from Soviet Union during 1944-1945.

See also
List of Russian weaponry
List of submachine guns
Tokarev Model 1927
MP35
Suomi KP/-31
PPSh-41

References

External links

 .
 .
 .
 The Soviet Union Adopts an SMG: Degtyarev's PPD-34/38

7.62×25mm Tokarev submachine guns
Simple blowback firearms
Submachine guns of the Soviet Union
Weapons and ammunition introduced in 1935
World War II submachine guns
World War II infantry weapons of the Soviet Union